John Kay may refer to:

 John Kay (caricaturist) (1742–1826), Scottish caricaturist
 John Kay (cricket journalist) (1910–1999), British cricket correspondent for The Argus
 John Kay (economist) (born 1948), Scottish economist, Financial Times columnist and author
 John Kay (English footballer) (born 1964), English former footballer
 John Kay (flying shuttle) (1704–c. 1779), English inventor of the flying shuttle textile machinery
 John Kay (journalist, born 1943) (1943–2021), British journalist convicted of the manslaughter of his wife, worked on Rupert Murdoch's The Sun
 Sir John Kay (judge) (1943–2004), Lord Justice of the Court of Appeal of England and Wales
 John Kay (musician) (born 1944), musician and lead singer of Canadian-American rock band Steppenwolf
 John Caius the Elder (fl. 1480), or John Kay, poet
 John Kay (poet born 1958), British poet and teacher
 John Kay (Poet Laureate) (14th century), English Poet Laureate of the United Kingdom
 John Kay (Scottish footballer), Scottish footballer of the 1870s and 1880s
 John Kay (spinning frame) (18th century), English developer of the spinning frame textile machinery
 John A. Kay (1830–?), architect in Columbia, South Carolina, US
 John Albert Kay, electrical engineer
 Jon Kay (born 1969), BBC broadcast journalist
 Johnny Kay (born 1940), lead guitarist for Bill Haley & His Comets from 1961 to 1967

See also
 John Cay (1790–1865), Scottish advocate, pioneer photographer and antiquarian
 John Kaye (disambiguation)
 Jack Kay (c. 1951–2015), American academic
 John K (disambiguation)
 Jonathan Kay (born 1968), Canadian journalist